KansasFest (also known as KFest) is an annual event for Apple II computer enthusiasts. Held every July at Rockhurst University in Kansas City, Missouri, KansasFest typically lasts five days and features presentations from Apple II experts and pioneers, as well as games, fun events, after-hours hallway chatter, late-night (or all-night) runs out to movies or restaurants, and more. A number of important new products have been released at KansasFest or developed through collaborations between individuals who likely would not have gotten together. Some of the most notable have been the introduction of the LANceGS Ethernet Card, and the Marinetti TCP/IP stack for the Apple IIGS.

Due to COVID-19, the 32nd and 33rd annual KansasFests were virtual-only, held July 24–25, 2020, and July 23–24, 2021, respectively. The 34th annual KansasFest is currently planned to be held July 18–23, 2023, at Rockhurst University.

History and organization

Resource Central
Vendor fairs were part of the earliest days of the microcomputer revolution. The Apple II had its debut at the first West Coast Computer Faire in April 1977. The popularity of this faire spawned other similar computer events elsewhere in the country. In the early 1980s, some of these vendor fairs became more computer-specific. For the Apple II computer, it began with AppleFest '81, sponsored by the Apple group in the Boston Computer Society. These festivals spread to be held in various places in the country, and Apple Computer became involved, even to the point of sending executives to give keynote addresses, and holding sessions for developers.

After the introduction of the Apple III, Lisa and Macintosh computers, Apple II users and developers were feeling increasingly isolated and ignored by Apple Computer. Tom Weishaar had started a newsletter, Open-Apple (later renamed to A2-Central) about the Apple II, and in it he provided information about the computer, how to use it, product reviews, and more. With time, he created a company named Resource Central to oversee the newsletter and other products available to sell to subscribers. Frustrated by Apple's diminishing emphasis on the Apple II, Weishaar planned a developer's conference that would specifically focus on the Apple II and Apple IIGS. The first event was held in July 1989, and was called the A2-Central Developer Conference, billed as a chance to "meet the people who will make the Apple II's future".

The conference brought together programmers, hardware developers, and Apple sent out a number of members of its Apple II group to participate in the meeting. What made it different from many similar meetings was the way in which the accommodations were handled. Resource Central, which was based in Overland Park, Kansas, arranged for the meeting and housing for many of the attendees at Avila College, a Catholic institution located in Kansas City, Missouri, not far from Overland Park. One of the unanticipated effects of this arrangement was that the college dorm environment encouraged interaction between participants in a way that would not have happened in a hotel. Nearly all who made the trip to the conference found it a significant and positive experience, and were more than ready to do it again the following year.

Resource Central continued to host these annual summer meetings, changing the name to the A2-Central Summer Conference. By the third meeting in 1991, its attendees had informally given it the name, "KansasFest", a portmanteau of "Kansas" and the "AppleFest" events held elsewhere in the country. Resource Central's sponsorship and management lasted through six KansasFest July conferences, the last being held in 1994.

KansasFest continues
Due to Apple Computer's decision to discontinue production of the Apple IIGS in late 1992 and the Apple IIe in late 1993, and the rise of the Macintosh and of computers running MS-DOS, the Apple II market began to rapidly diminish. At Resource Central, finances became a problem during 1994, and a crisis hit the company at the start of 1995. Declining renewals of the A2-Central newsletter and other products the company sold could no longer sustain the business, and it was necessary to shut down in February of that year. This put into doubt the prospects of continuing the annual KansasFest meeting. To rescue it, a committee was formed amongst previous attendees, coordinated online via GEnie. By spring of 1995 they had secured Avila for a two-day meeting, and had enough who had committed to come that KansasFest 1995 could be held.

From 1995 through 2004, KansasFest continued to be held at Avila (which changed its name to Avila University in 2002). In the earlier years, it served as an annual rallying point for the Apple II community, as it found itself in a world shrinking in resources that would support it. Like Resource Central, other businesses that dealt with the Apple II also found it difficult to survive. The online homes for direct-dial Apple II access (GEnie, CompuServe, Delphi, and America Online) were having problems with either Y2K or transition to the World Wide Web, and were phasing out their text-based access. Although the annual KansasFest event was coordinated on those online services, the physical meeting provided a recurring connection point.

By the time its second decade began in 1999, KansasFest was becoming as much about preservation of the past as it was about advancing the Apple II platform. The conference began to also have sessions covering computing on the Macintosh, Newton, and Palm computers. Attendees were often not programmers or developers, but increasingly were those who enjoyed retrocomputing or had a nostalgic connection with the Apple II. It was also a venue for demonstration of new uses for the Apple II that had never been previously considered. For example, Michael Mahon showed off his AppleCrate parallel processing Apple II in 2007, with a number of Apple IIe boards connected together, updated to a seventeen board system by the following year. A programmer, David Schmenk wrote a first-person maze game in 2007, "Escape From The Homebrew Computer Club" using 16-color lo-res graphics, something that could have been run on an Apple II in 1977 if anyone had thought of it. He demonstrated this game at KansasFest in 2011.

Furthermore, the committee began to seek out keynote speakers from outside of the immediate community, to increase interest in the event. This trend began in 2003, when Steve Wozniak agreed to speak to a turnout that was double that of the previous year. Other speakers have included David Sztela (of Nibble magazine, later employed at Apple), Lane Roathe (early Apple II game programmer), Jason Scott (digital preservationist), Mark Simonsen (of Beagle Bros), and Bob Bishop (programmer and Apple employee).

Starting in 2005, the event began to be held at a new venue, Rockhurst University, nine miles to the north of Avila, and still in Kansas City, Missouri. Though attendance reached an all-time low of 28 in 2006, it has been steadily climbing since. Fans of the Apple II computer come from all over the United States, and have come from Canada, Australia and Great Britain.

Committee / Corporation
From 1995 through 2014, a volunteer group each year took it upon themselves to arrange the facility for the following year's event, send out invitations, promote the event, and make sure that there were speakers, sessions, contests, and places to go outside of the meeting area.

In 2015, the committee officially incorporated KansasFest, better defining the organization in order to continue to steer the event into the future. In 2020, KansasFest became a 501(c)(3) organization (tax ID 47-3514247).

Events

Advancing the platform
Important contributions to the Apple II have made their appearance at KansasFest. In 1996, a meeting between Richard Bennett of Australia, Ewen Wannop of Great Britain, and Geoff Weiss of the United States set the groundwork for the announcement at the 1997 meeting of the Marinetti control panel for the Apple IIGS. This system extension made possible TCP/IP connections to the Internet (something that Apple had never designed the computer to do). Also in 1997, some of the first Apple II web sites began to appear, and by the following year KansasFest had its own web site. In the next several years, it was common to see release of a CD-ROM collection of Apple II files of various kinds. In 2000, an Ethernet card called LANceGS for the Apple IIGS was demonstrated, and plans were made for a post-Delphi text-based contact point for Apple II users on the Internet, Syndicomm Online.

Recurring
Most years have one or more contests. These have included:
 HackFest - participants are given a focused period of time while at the event to create from scratch a program that does something cool. 
 Tie One On - wear the most unusual or crazy tie at the banquet
 Door Decoration - being a college dorm, the doors can be decorated any interesting way desired
 Bite The Bag - a contest of agility in picking up a paper bag by biting it, with only one extremity touching the floor
 Games - Contestants attempt to achieve the highest score on classic Apple II games, such as GShisen or Lode Runner.
 Exhibits - demonstrating products or retro Apple II-related items

Another popular event held for many years was a "celebrity" roast of prominent members of the Apple II community.

Dates and milestones

Apple II Forever awards

Starting in 2010, the KansasFest Committee began to award members of the Apple II community who had made significant contributions to the Apple II, either in promoting or developing for the platform during its active years, or in helping to advance or preserve the Apple II since its production had been discontinued.

External links
 
 KansasFest on Twitter
 KansasFest on YouTube

Notes

Apple Inc. conferences
Apple II family
Apple II periodicals
Events in Kansas City, Missouri